Xiangjiangite is a phosphate mineral discovered near and named for the Xiang Jiang River in China. It was approved by the IMA in 1978, and was named after its locality.

Properties 
Xiangjiangite is a pleochroic mineral, which is an optical phenomenon, meaning that depending on the axis it is viewed on, it appears as it changes colors. On both the X and Y axis, it can be seen in a yellow color, while on the Z axis it appears to be weak yellow color. This mineral is very strongly radioactive, and has a 3,845,084.01 radioactivity measured in GRapi.

It mainly consists of uranium (49.67%) and oxygen (39.23%), but otherwise contains sulphur (3.35%), phosphorus (3.23%), hydrogen (2.37%), iron (1.46%) and aluminum (0.70%).

References

Phosphate minerals
Tetragonal minerals